Piet Roozenburg (24 October 1924 in Rotterdam – 27 April 2003 in Ochten) was a draughts player from the Netherlands.

He was an important figure in the game, having been the world's draughts champion in 1948, 1951, 1952 and 1954. He created the "Roozenburg system" of play and wrote on the game. He was named Dutch sportsman of the year in 1948.

In his professional life he worked as an economist. His brother Wim was also a successful draughts player.

References

External links
  In Memoriam
Piet Roozenburg. Koninklijke Nederlandse Dambond

1924 births
2003 deaths
Dutch draughts players
Players of international draughts
Sportspeople from Rotterdam
20th-century Dutch people